Colonel John Granville, 1st Baron Granville of Potheridge PC (12 April 1665 – 3 December 1707), styled The Honourable John Granville until 1703, was an English soldier, landowner and politician.

Background and education
Granville was the second son of John Granville, 1st Earl of Bath, by Jane Wyche, daughter of Sir Peter Wyche. He was the grandson of Sir Bevil Grenville and the younger brother of Charles Granville, 2nd Earl of Bath. He was educated at Christ Church, Oxford.

Political career
Granville fought alongside his elder brother in the Imperial Army during the Battle of Vienna in 1683. Two years later he was returned to Parliament for Launceston, a seat he held until 1687. He welcomed the Glorious Revolution of 1688 and led a force of Grenadiers in support of William of Orange at the Siege of Cork in September, 1690. He had been appointed Captain of Deal Castle in February, 1690, but lost the position for political reasons, along with his colonelcy in the Guards and his captaincy of a man-of-war, in December of that year.

In 1689 he was elected to Parliament for Plymouth. He notably made four speeches attacking the conditions of the Royal Navy and was a member of the committee set up to make recommendations on relieving wounded seamen. He continued to sit for Plymouth until 1698, and then represented Newport until 1700, Fowey from January to December 1701 and Cornwall from 1701 to 1703. He was in opposition during the whole reign of William III. When Queen Anne succeeded to the throne in 1702, Granville was sworn of the Privy Council. In 1703 he was raised to the peerage as Baron Granville of Potheridge, of Potheridge in the County of Devon, and appointed Lord-Lieutenant of Cornwall, Lord Warden of the Stannaries and Lieutenant-General of the Ordnance, posts he held until 1705. The latter year he again went into opposition.

Family
Lord Granville of Potheridge married Rebeccah Child, daughter of Sir Josiah Child, 1st Baronet, and widow of Charles Somerset, Marquess of Worcester, in 1703. They had no children. He died in December 1707 after an apoplectic seizure, aged 42. As he had no children the barony died with him. He was buried at St Clement Danes, London.

References

1665 births
1707 deaths
Alumni of Christ Church, Oxford
Members of the Privy Council of England
Younger sons of earls
John
English MPs 1685–1687
English MPs 1689–1690
English MPs 1690–1695
English MPs 1698–1700
English MPs 1701
English MPs 1701–1702
English MPs 1702–1705
Captains of Deal Castle
Lord-Lieutenants of Cornwall
Barons Granville
Peers of England created by Queen Anne
Members of the Parliament of England for Plymouth